The Colonial States Athletic Conference (CSAC) is an NCAA Division III collegiate athletic conference in the Mid-Atlantic United States. There are currently nine full member institutions as of 2018.  The conference's membership, as with most Middle Atlantic conferences, was shaken as a result of the formation of the Landmark Conference and its ensuing domino effect.  The conference, founded in 1992 as the Pennsylvania Athletic Conference, changed its name in 2008.

The CSAC experienced another shakeup in 2018 when five members departed the conference to join with two other institutions to form a new Division III conference that eventually became the Atlantic East Conference. In July 2018, the CSAC added two new members. The conference added its 10th member on July 1, 2019, and its 11th on the same day in 2020, but was reduced to 10 members when on June 18, 2021, Centenary University published its move to Atlantic East, starting July 1 that year, but its lacrosse teams would start competing in their new conference's 2022 season.

History

Chronological timeline
 1991 - On November 4, 1991, the CSAC was founded as the Pennsylvania Athletic Conference (PAC). Charter members included Alvernia College, Beaver College (now Arcadia University), Cabrini College (now Cabrini University), Cedar Crest College, Eastern University, Gwynedd-Mercy College (now Gwynedd Mercy University), Immaculata University, Marywood University, College Misericordia (now Misericordia University) and Rosemont College; effective beginning the 1992-93 academic year.
 1992 - Neumann College (now Neumann University) joined the PAC alongside the other 10 charter members in September 1992.
 1993 - On April 28, 1993, the PAC was granted affiliate membership within the National Collegiate Athletic Association (NCAA) in the 1993-94 academic year.
 1993 - Allentown College (now DeSales University) joined the PAC in the 1993-94 academic year.
 1995 - The PAC had achieved full membership within the NCAA Division III ranks in the 1995-96 academic year.
 1997 - DeSales left the PAC to join the Middle Atlantic Conferences after the 1996-97 academic year.
 1997 - Wesley College joined the PAC in the 1997-98 academic year.
 2001 - Shenandoah University and Villa Julie College (now Stevenson University) joined the PAC as associate members for men's lacrosse in the 2002 spring season (2001-02 academic year).
 2006 - Stevenson left the PAC as an associate member for men's lacrosse after the 2006 spring season (2005-06 academic year).
 2007 - Arcadia and Wesley (Del.) left the PAC to join the Middle Atlantic Conferences after the 2006-07 academic year.
 2007 - Centenary College of New Jersey (now Centenary University) and the College of Notre Dame of Maryland (now Notre Dame of Maryland University) joined the PAC in the 2007-08 academic year.
 2008 - Alvernia, Eastern (Pa.) and Misericordia left the PAC to join the Middle Atlantic Conferences after the 2007-08 academic year.
 2008 - The PAC was re-designated the Colonial States Athletic Conference (CSAC) in the 2008-09 academic year.
 2008 - Baptist Bible College (now Clarks Summit University), Keystone College and Philadelphia Biblical University (now Cairn University) joined the CSAC in the 2008-09 academic year.
 2012 - Shenandoah left the CSAC as an associate member for men's lacrosse after the 2012 spring season (2011-12 academic year).
 2015 - Franciscan University of Steubenville and Pennsylvania State University at Erie, The Behrend College joined the CSAC as associate members for men's and women's indoor and outdoor track & field in the 2016 spring season (2015-16 academic year).
 2018 - Cabrini, Gwynedd Mercy, Immaculata, Marywood and Neumann left the CSAC to join the newly-formed Atlantic East Conference (AEC) after the 2017-18 academic year.
 2018 - Bryn Athyn College and Wilson College joined the CSAC in the 2018-19 academic year.
 2018 - Alfred State College joined the CSAC as an associate member for men's and women's indoor and outdoor track & field in the 2019 spring season (2018-19 academic year).
 2018 - Kean University, Montclair State University and Stockton University joined the CSAC as associate members for men's lacrosse in the 2019 spring season (2018-19 academic year).
 2018 - The University of Valley Forge joined the CSAC as an associate member for baseball in the 2019 spring season (2018-19 academic year).
 2019
 Franciscan left the CSAC as an associate member for men's and women's indoor and outdoor track & field after the 2019 spring season (2018-19 academic year).
 The College of Saint Elizabeth (now Saint Elizabeth University) joined the CSAC in the 2019-20 academic year.
 Lancaster Bible College joined the CSAC as an associate member for field hockey in the 2019 fall season (2019-20 academic year).
 2020
 Valley Forge would later upgrade to join the CSAC for all sports in the 2020-21 academic year.
 Gallaudet University joined the CSAC as an associate member for men's and women's indoor and outdoor track & field in the 2021 spring season (2020-21 academic year).
 2021
 Centenary (N.J.) left the CSAC to join Atlantic East Conference after the 2020-21 academic year; although its field hockey and women's lacrosse teams would remain in the CSAC as associate members until the 2022 spring season (2021-22 academic year).
 Pratt Institute joined for men's volleyball effective with the 2022 season (2021–22 academic year).
 2022
 The CSAC and the United East Conference announced their intent to merge, beginning in the fall 2023 season.
 Lancaster Bible added men's volleyball to its CSAC membership.
 2023 – Notre Dame of Maryland will add men's sports for the 2023–24 academic year.

Member schools

Current members
The CSAC currently has ten full members, all are private schools:

Notes

Affiliate members
The CSAC has nine affiliate members:

Notes

Former members
The CSAC had 12 former full members, all were private schools:

Notes

Former affiliate members
The CSAC had ee former affiliate members, half were private and the other half were public schools:

Notes

Membership timeline

Staff
 Marie Stroman - Commissioner
 Antonio "Tone" Cockrell - Assistant Commissioner of Strategic Initiatives

References

External links